David Kern may refer to:

 David J. Kern, U.S. Navy officer
 David Morris Kern (1909–2013), American pharmacist and businessman